Royella is a genus of sea snails, marine gastropod mollusks in the family Cerithiidae.

Species
Species within the genus Royella include:

 Royella sinon (Bayle, 1880)

References

External links
 

Cerithiidae
Monotypic gastropod genera